Uhland may refer to:
Ludwig Uhland (1787-1862), German poet
Uhland, Texas
9052 Uhland, Asteroid